The First Church of Woburn, formerly the First Congregational Church in Woburn, is a historic nondenominational Christian church at 322 Main Street in Woburn, Massachusetts.  The congregation, established in 1642, is one of the oldest in the United States, and its church building (the sixth for the congregation) is a local landmark.  The Italianate-style church was built in 1860, and its  steeple is believed to be the tallest wooden steeple in North America.
The church is home to a historic E&GG Hook pipe organ, dating to the time of the church's construction.

The church building has been listed on the National Register of Historic Places since 1992.  The congregation was originally Puritan, as were all acknowledged churches in Massachusetts at the time, and was later affiliated with the United Church of Christ in the early 20th century until resigning the denomination in the late 1980s.  It is now declared nondenominational in the evangelical tradition but did not drop the Congregational designation from its name until 2018.

See also

National Register of Historic Places listings in Middlesex County, Massachusetts

References

External links
Official web site

United Church of Christ churches in Massachusetts
Churches completed in 1860
19th-century United Church of Christ church buildings
Churches on the National Register of Historic Places in Massachusetts
Churches in Middlesex County, Massachusetts
Woburn, Massachusetts
National Register of Historic Places in Middlesex County, Massachusetts